Thayyur  is a village in Thrissur district in the state of Kerala, India.

Thayyur is administered under Velur Panchayat. This village is in between Erumapetty and Velur. This village is a sample for religious harmony and have a Temple, Church and Mosque. Many nearby students study in the Thayyur Govt. High School situated in the centre of Thayyur.

According to Census 2011 information the location code or village code of Thayyur village is 680584. Thayyur village is located in Talappilly Tehsil of Thrissur district in Kerala, India. Erumapetty is nearest town to Thayyur village. Thayyur is first complete computer literacy village in India.

References

Villages in Thrissur district